The 2022 Indianapolis 500 (branded as the 106th Running of the Indianapolis 500 presented by Gainbridge for sponsorship reasons) was a 500-mile (804.7 km, 200 lap) race in the 2022 IndyCar Series, held on Sunday, May 29, 2022, at the Indianapolis Motor Speedway in Speedway, Indiana. The month of May activities formally began on May 14 with the GMR Grand Prix on the combined road course. Practice on the oval opened on May 17, and time trials took place on May 21–22. Carb Day, the traditional final day of practice, along with the Pit Stop Challenge, took place on May 27.

Six-time IndyCar champion, and 2008 Indianapolis 500 winner Scott Dixon won the pole position, his fifth career Indy 500 pole. It was also Chip Ganassi Racing's seventh Indy pole. Dixon moved into second on the all-time list for poles at Indy, behind only Rick Mears, who had six. The top twelve starting positions saw a near even split with seven Hondas and five Chevrolets. During the race, Dixon became the all-time lap leader in the history of the Indy 500.

Dixon led the most laps (95), and dominated much of the race along with teammate Álex Palou. With 25 laps to go, however, during his final pit stop, Dixon was penalized for speeding entering the pit lane. Dixon was issued a drive-through penalty, which took him out of contention and handed the lead to his teammate, Marcus Ericsson. Ericsson held off a furious charge from Pato O'Ward on a restart with two laps to go to win the race. Ericsson became the second Swedish winner in the race's history, after Kenny Bräck in 1999.

Race background

Sponsorship
On January 31, 2019, it was announced that the online financial services company Gainbridge would become the new presenting sponsor of the 500 under a four-year deal. This will be the fourth year under the current deal.

Rule changes
During pit stops, crew members are prohibited from physically assisting with the car's exit of the pit box. A car must leave the pits under its own power and can not be pushed.
All pneumatic wheel guns must not have any electronic devices attached. "Smart" wheel guns, with electronic torque sensors, have been banned.
Championship bonus points will be awarded to the top twelve qualifiers. This reflects a new qualifying procedure (see below). From 2018 to 2021, the top nine qualifiers earned bonus points. Now, the pole position winner receives 12 bonus points, down to 1 bonus point for the 12th qualifier (12–11–10–9–8–7–6–5–4–3–2–1). Points earned for the race finishing positions are unchanged. All finishers earn double championships points for the Indy 500 (the case since 2014).

Qualifying changes
The Two-day format that began in 2019 has been expanded, based on the popularity of the three-round system used for most of the IndyCar road and street courses events. The system will continue to use the two day system (Saturday May 21 & Sunday May 22), and cars will continue to utilize the traditional four-lap qualifying attempts. The top twelve cars from the first day will advance to a new second round that will take place on the second day. The top six cars in the second round advance to the final round to determine the pole position as well as starting positions two through six. If more than 33 entries take part in the event, the Last Chance Qualifying session will be used once again to set starting positions 31–32–33.

On Saturday, the procedure will be as follows:
Qualifying will be open from 12:00 p.m. to 5:50 p.m. All cars entered will be guaranteed at least one attempt. Additional attempts are allowed, time/weather permitting.
Cars ranking 1–12 will advance to Second Round Qualifying.
Cars ranking 13–30 will be locked-in to those starting positions, and will not re-qualify.
Cars ranking 31 and lower will be entered into the Last Chance Qualifying.
If there are only 33 entries, the Last Chance Qualifying will not be held, and instead all positions 13–33 will be locked-in.

On Sunday, time trials will conclude as follows:
At 2 p.m. the Last Chance Qualifying session will be held (if necessary). Entries that ranked 31st and lower on Saturday will have at least one attempt to qualify. Qualifying speeds from Saturday will be erased. Additional attempts will be allowed, time/weather permitting, until 3 p.m. Starting positions 31–32–33 will be filled. All other cars from 34th and lower will fail to qualify.
At 4 p.m., the second round of qualifying will be held. The cars that ranked 1st through 12th on Saturday will have one guaranteed attempt. Qualifying speeds from Saturday will be erased. Cars will go out in reverse order (12th to 1st). The cars ranking 7th through 12th will be locked-in to those starting positions. The top six cars will advance to the final round.
At 5:10 p.m., the final round of qualifying will be held. The cars that ranked 1st through 6th during the second round will have one guaranteed attempt. Qualifying speeds from the Top 12 session will be erased. Cars will go out in reverse order (6th to 1st). The top six starting positions will be set, including the pole position.

2022 IndyCar Series

The 2022 Indianapolis 500 was the sixth race of the 2022 NTT IndyCar Series season. Four different drivers won the first five races of the season, including one first-time winner. Scott McLaughlin won the season opener at St. Petersburg, his first career IndyCar win. At Texas, Josef Newgarden won, passing McLaughlin coming off the last turn of the last lap. Newgarden followed up with another win at Long Beach and Pato O'Ward won at Alabama in a time-shortened race (two hours) due to rain. The GMR Grand Prix was won by Colton Herta. Despite zero wins thus far on the season, Will Power entered the 500 as the series points leader.

Race schedules
The 2022 IndyCar Series schedule was announced on September 19, 2021. The Indianapolis 500 was for Sunday, May 29. Practice, time trials, and other ancillary events are scheduled for the two weeks leading up to the race. The GMR Grand Prix, including the Road to Indy races, will again serve as the opening weekend of track activity, on May 14. The Freedom 100 for the Indy Lights was left off the schedule for the third year in a row, with Roger Penske citing safety as an issue. The 2022 Indy Lights season will only include a race on the road course during GMR Grand Prix weekend.

Source: 2022 Indianapolis 500 Event Schedule

Entry list

All entries utilized the Dallara DW12 chassis with the Universal Aero Kit 18, with Firestone tires.
A total of 32 car/driver combinations were made official in time for the Open test on April 20. Paretta Autosport (in technical alliance with Ed Carpenter Racing) announced on April 19 that they would not enter, electing instead to focus on road/street course races during the summer months. The 33rd and final entry was announced on May 5, with DragonSpeed and Cusick Motorsports joining to field a car. The official entry list was published on May 16, 2022.

 Former Indianapolis 500 Winner
 Indianapolis 500 Rookie

Testing and Rookie Orientation

October 2021

A private offseason Firestone tire test was scheduled for October 8. Hélio Castroneves (Meyer Shank Racing) and Pato O'Ward (Arrow McLaren SP) were scheduled to participate. Jimmie Johnson (Ganassi) and Romain Grosjean (Andretti) were scheduled to complete the Rookie Orientation Program during a separate session on October 6.

Rookie Orientation consists of three phases. Lingering rain hampered track activity, but the track was dried and Johnson and Grosjean both completed Phase 1 and Phase 2. Both drivers completed about half of Phase 3 before a downpour closed the track for the day at 4:15 p.m.. Series officials announced that both drivers had completed a satisfactory amount of laps, and would be eligible to participate in the full-field Open Test scheduled for April.

On Friday October 8, Castroneves and O'Ward conducted baseline testing, as well as preliminary KERS testing. No incidents were reported, and no speeds were announced.

Veteran Only Test — Wednesday April 20
Weather: , light rain early, cloudy in the afternoon
Summary: A full-field open test was scheduled at the Indianapolis Motor Speedway oval for April 20–21, 2022. All 32 confirmed entries for the 2022 Indianapolis 500 were present for the test. Light rain delayed testing by roughly 90 minutes, with the veterans only session beginning at roughly 12:30 p.m. McLaughlin was fastest in the "no-tow" rankings – laps set without the benefit of aerodynamic drafting. The only significant incident of the opening session came when Alexander Rossi spun in the pit exit lane during his first installment lap, but avoided any contact and continued on.

Rookie Orientation / Refresher tests — Wednesday April 20
Summary: At 2:30 p.m., the track was opened to drivers needing to complete Rookie Orientation and veteran Refresher tests. Eight drivers took to the track during the session, with all rookies and two of the veterans completing their tests. Juan Pablo Montoya and Sage Karam did not pass their refresher programs, but had completed enough to be allowed on track for the full-field session later in the day. No incidents were reported.

Open Test — Wednesday April 20

Summary: The track was opened to the full field at 4:30 p.m. and was scheduled to stay open until 6:30 p.m. This session saw two significant incidents. At roughly 5:10 p.m., Hélio Castroneves lost control of his car in the warm up lane heading into turn 2. Castroneves spun nearly 360 degrees before impacting the outside wall. About twenty minutes later, Will Power spun from the warm up lane in turn 1 and out onto the racing surface. Colton Herta narrowly avoided Power's car, but lost control of his own in the process, suffering light damage to the rear of the car as he brushed the outside wall at the exit of turn 1. Marcus Ericsson narrowly avoided Herta's spinning car and continued on back to the pit lane with no damage. IndyCar elected to end the session 40 minutes early to allow officials and representatives from Firestone to examine the pit exit lane for a potential cause for the three incidents that occurred during the day.

Open Test — Thursday April 21
Weather: , rain in the morning, mostly cloudy in the afternoon
Summary: The second day of a full-field open test was scheduled April 22 from 10 a.m. to 4 p.m. After three incidents on the warm-up lane during testing on Wednesday, series and track officials inspected the course overnight. A chemical sealant applied to the asphalt surface the previous autumn was believed to be the culprit. The grip levels on the warm-up lanes were measured to be significantly lower than that of the racing surface. Track crews spent the night prepping the asphalt along the warm-up lanes and pit lane by dragging tires and scrubbing the surface. Due to morning rain and moisture, Thursday's testing was rescheduled for 2:30 p.m. to 6:30 p.m. Speeds increased across nearly the whole field for the second test day, with 15 drivers completing laps quicker than the fastest time from the opening day. Hélio Castroneves was the only driver to not partake in the session, as his Meyer Shank Racing team elected not to run after the opening day crash to repair damages. There were no incidents during the Thursday session.

Practice

Opening Day — Tuesday May 17

Weather: , Fair to partly cloudy

Veteran session
Summary: The opening day of practice began at 9:00 a.m. with a one hour-fifteen minute session for veterans and those who had finished their rookie/refresher tests. All entries took to the track except for Stefan Wilson, who needed to complete his veteran refresher program later in the day. No major incidents were reported. During initial install laps, Ed Carpenter, Jimmie Johnson, and Scott Dixon all came to the pits with smoke pouring from their engine bays. After investigation from the respective crews, the smoke was nothing more than routine burn-off of excess sealant.

Rookie and refresher tests
At 12:00 p.m., the track was opened for three hours for rookie and refresher testing. As nearly all drivers had participated in the April test session, Stefan Wilson was the lone participant in the session. Wilson passed his refresher test without incident.

Combined session

All 33 drivers took to the track during the session, turning a combined 3,229 laps. No major incidents were reported, but the session was briefly disrupted by a fox entering the race course. Honda-powered machines took eight of the top ten spots for the session.

Wednesday May 18
Weather: , rain
Summary: Rain washed out practice for the day. The track was officially closed at 3:15 p.m. It was the first time since 2016 that an entire practice day was lost to weather.

Thursday May 19
Weather: , Mostly cloudy
Summary: Thursday practice opened at 12:00 p.m. and remained open until 6:00 p.m. A total of 3,114 laps were turned across all cars. There were no incidents reported. The practice was the last pre-qualifying session using race day turbo boost levels, as teams would increase boost to qualifying levels for "Fast Friday".

Fast Friday — Friday May 20
Weather: , Partly cloudy, strong sustained winds with gusts up to  
Summary: Friday practice saw teams increase boost pressures to qualifying levels in preparation for the weekend qualifying sessions. Running was limited throughout the day due to strong winds, with few teams electing to turn more than 20 laps. The first notable incident of the month came just before 1:30 p.m. Jimmie Johnson drifted wide in turn 2 and made light contact with the outside wall. Johnson suffered only minor damage and was able to return to the track later in the day. After practice, a random draw was conducted to determine qualifying order, with teams drawing in order of Fast Friday practice results.

Time Trials

Qualifying — Saturday, May 21
Weather: , mostly cloudy early, scattered thunderstorms later. 
Summary: Time trials on Saturday locked in starting positions 13th–33rd. Cars ranking 1st–12th advanced to the Top 12 Qualifying session on Sunday.

In anticipation of forecast afternoon rain storms, IndyCar officials moved the start of qualifications up one hour to 11:00 a.m. Several minor incidents dotted the day. Juan Pablo Montoya's car failed pre-qualifying inspection, causing him to lose his guaranteed attempt and was only permitted to run after all others completed their guaranteed attempt. Stefan Wilson also saw pre-qualifying drama, as the engine in his car failed during the morning practice session. Wilson did not make a qualifying attempt, relegating him to starting 33rd for the race.

During qualification runs, Takuma Sato had his first attempt disallowed after he neglected to use the turn three warmup lane on his cool down lap, resulting in him interfering with Marco Andretti's run. Andretti had further issues on his run with engine problems causing him to lose significant time on his third lap. Sato and Andretti would later requalify and improve their times. Sato advanced to the Fast 12 session on Sunday, despite brushing the wall in turn two on his third lap. Andretti's teammate Colton Herta suffered an engine failure on his first attempt and was forced to change engines before making a second run later in the day.

Rain began to fall on the track just before 2:30 p.m. After roughly one hour, the track was dried and two more runs were completed, but more rain began to fall just before 4:00 p.m., with IndyCar calling an end to Saturday qualifications at roughly 4:50 p.m. VeeKay's attempt was the third fastest qualifying run in Indianapolis 500 history.

Qualifying — Sunday May 22
Weather: , Mostly cloudy

Top 12 qualifying
Summary: Cars ranking 1st–12th from Saturday participated in the Top 12 Qualifying session. After the first round, cars ranking 7th–12th were locked in to those starting positions. The top six cars advanced to the Firestone Fast Six session. Participants in the Top 12 session were given a 90-minute practice session starting at 12 p.m.

The Top 12 session commenced at 4:00 p.m., with each driver permitted one attempt. Drivers took to the track in reverse order of the results from Saturday qualifying. Rinus VeeKay, Álex Palou, Marcus Ericsson, Ed Carpenter, and Tony Kanaan also advanced to the Fast Six round. There were no incidents, though Jimmie Johnson nearly lost control of his car on his run, resulting in him being last of the top 12. After the conclusion of the session, those that qualified for the Fast Six shootout were given a five-minute period behind the pace car to cool their engines down for the next run.

Fast Six qualifying
Summary: The Firestone Fast Six session determined starting positions 1st–6th. Running commenced at roughly 5:15 p.m. It was also the second-fastest qualifying run ever, only behind the mark set by Arie Luyendyk, also in 1996. It also marked a new record for the fastest front row in Speedway history, with the front row starters, Dixon, Álex Palou, and Rinus VeeKay, averaging  between them. It was Dixon's fifth career pole position for the Indianapolis 500, moving him to second all-time behind Rick Mears.

Post-Qualifying practice

Post-qualifying practice — Monday, May 23
Weather: , mostly cloudy.
Summary: Following qualifying, teams returned to race day levels of turbo boost for practice. A two-hour session was scheduled for Monday, with the track opening at 1:00 p.m. The first major incident of the month came just before 2:30 p.m. Dalton Kellett lost control of his car in turn one after being overtaken, resulting in him heavily impacting the outside wall and momentarily lifting onto two wheels from the impact. Kellett was uninjured in the accident.

Carb Day — Friday, May 27
Weather: , light rain showers in the morning, cloudy in the afternoon.
Summary: The final practice was initially scheduled for 11:00 a.m., but due to rain showers in the morning, practice was delayed to 1:00 p.m., with teams allowed a 1-hour 30 minute session. Two major incidents occurred during practice. At roughly 1:45 p.m., Santino Ferrucci and David Malukas made contact entering turn 1. The contact cut down a tire on Malukas's car, causing him to lose control and impact the outside wall. Malukas was uninjured in the incident, while Ferrucci was held on pit lane for 20 minutes as penalty for avoidable contact with Malukas. The second major incident came at roughly 2:05 p.m. Colton Herta lost control of his car at the exit of turn 1, spun, and impacted the outside wall. The impact lifted the front of the car off the ground, allowing the front to pitch up and blow the car over. The car landed upside down and skidded to a halt in turn 2. Herta was uninjured in the accident, but was forced to move to a backup car for the race. After the practice session, participating crews moved on to the annual Pit Stop Challenge which returned for the first time since 2019 as it was not held in 2020 and 2021 due to the global COVID-19 pandemic.

Pit Stop Challenge 
The Pit Stop Challenge returned to the Carb Day schedule for the first time since 2019. The event was scheduled to start at 2:30 p.m., after Carb Day practice had concluded, but was delayed to 3:30 due to early weather holds. 14 teams were invited to participate. Colton Herta's team was entered, but withdrew after Herta's crash during the earlier practice session. Team Penske won the pit stop challenge with Josef Newgarden's car, winning the best-of-three final against Chip Ganassi Racing with Scott Dixon's car. It was Penske's 18th win in the competition and the third for chief mechanic Travis Law. One incident occurred during the challenge when Sage Karam spun and nearly collided with Felix Rosenqvist in the first round when his Dreyer & Reinbold Racing team failed to secure a tire on his car.

Starting grid

Race report

Weather: , Partly cloudy with moderate sustained winds.

First half
At the start, Álex Palou took the early lead of the race, with Rinus VeeKay and Scott Dixon behind. Dixon eventually passed VeeKay for second, allowing him and his teammate Palou to exchange positions regularly to drive to conserve fuel. These three remained at the front through to the first pit stops, which came around lap 31. After pit stops, VeeKay emerged ahead of Dixon for second. On lap 39, VeeKay caused the race's first caution period after losing control of his car in turn two and impacting the outside wall. VeeKay was uninjured, but was relegated to finishing 33rd and last. After the accident, Chip Ganassi Racing cars ran 1–2–3, with Palou leading Dixon and Marcus Ericsson.

Racing resumed on lap 47, with Palou and Dixon resuming their attempt at fuel conservation. This continued to the second round of pit stops, which began at roughly lap 67. Just as the first stops began happening, Callum Ilott lost control of his car in turn two and impacted the outside wall before skidding back across the track and making light contact with the inside wall on the backstraight. Ilott suffered broken bones in his right hand, but was able to climb from the car unassisted. The injuries would force Ilott to miss the next race of the IndyCar season. The incident brought out the race's second caution period. Race leader Álex Palou was worst effected by the timing of the caution. Palou entered pit lane just after it closed for the caution, forcing him to drive through without taking service. Two laps later, with the pits still closed, Palou was forced to take emergency service to prevent running out of fuel, with the penalty being starting at the end of the field for the restart. The sequence took Palou out of contention for the win for the remainder of the race. Everyone else who had not pitted before the caution came in once the pits opened. Scott Dixon assumed the lead of the race, having stopped just before Ilott's crash, while Conor Daly vaulted up the order to second.

Racing resumed at lap 78, with Dixon maintaining his lead over Daly. At lap 80, Daly overtook Dixon for the lead, but only led for a few laps before Dixon returned to the front. The running order remained largely the same to halfway. At the halfway mark, Scott Dixon held the lead over Daly, Pato O'Ward, Marcus Ericsson, and Tony Kanaan.

Second half
The third caution period of the race came out on lap 106, when Romain Grosjean lost control of his car in turn two and impacted the outside wall. Grosjean was uninjured in the accident. During the caution, the majority of the field pitted again, with Scott Dixon being first out of the pits. Dixon would line up second for the restart behind Conor Daly, who had pitted just before the caution.

Racing got under way once again on lap 112. On the restart, Pato O'Ward passed both Daly and Dixon to take the lead of the race, while Santino Ferrucci moved into the top-five positions after passing several cars. Dixon quickly took the lead from O'Ward, with O'Ward settling in behind in a bid to conserve fuel. Daly ran third, Ferrucci fourth, and Felix Rosenqvist fifth. At lap 141, the penultimate round of pit stops began. O'Ward emerged from the pits with the lead over Dixon, while O'Ward's teammate Rosenqvist moved to third.

The fourth caution period of the day came at lap 151, when Scott McLaughlin lost control of his car in turn three. McLaughlin impacted the outside wall, then continued to slide into turn four before impacting the wall again and nearly collecting Ed Carpenter in the incident. McLaughlin emerged uninjured in the wreck and later indicated that he had been caught out by the wind, which had increased since the start of the race.

Racing resumed at lap 158, with Dixon immediately passing O'Ward to take over the lead again, with Felix Rosenqvist third, Conor Daly fourth, and Marcus Ericsson fifth. This order remained the same until the final round of pit stops, which began at roughly lap 173. Dixon pitted from the lead on lap 175, but locked the rear tires entering the lane, causing him to be over the pit lane speed limit at the pit entry line. Dixon received a drive-through penalty for the mistake, removing him from contention to win despite leading nearly half of the race. With Dixon removed from the lead battle, the front pack now consisted of O'Ward, Felix Rosenqvist, and Dixon's teammate Marcus Ericsson, who had gained substantially on the Arrow McLaren SP cars during the pit sequence. Ericsson moved around O'Ward and Rosenqvist and began to pull away while dealing with slower lapped traffic. Marco Andretti and Jimmie Johnson briefly lead ahead of this group, but were on an alternate pit strategy and both pitted by lap 190, handing the lead to Ericsson.

Finish
The fifth caution period of the day came at lap 194, when Jimmie Johnson lost control of his car in turn two after entering too low, causing him to impact the outside wall. Johnson was uninjured in the accident. In an effort to ensure the race did not finish under a caution period, IndyCar officials stopped the race to clean up the wreckage, setting up a two-lap shootout to the end. At the red flag, Ericsson led O'Ward, Tony Kanaan, Rosenqvist, and Alexander Rossi.

Racing resumed on lap 199, with Rosenqvist diving to the inside of Kanaan on the restart, allowing Ericsson and O'Ward to gap the duo down the backstretch. Ericsson started weaving across the track in an effort to break the draft that O'Ward would get. On the final lap, O'Ward drew even with Ericsson entering turn one, but was unable to execute a pass. As the leaders reached turn three for the final time, the sixth and final caution period came as Sage Karam impacted the wall in turn two and skidded to a halt on the backstraight grass. Karam was sent to a local hospital after complaining of musculoskeletal soreness, but was released shortly thereafter with no injuries. The caution period effectively ended the race, with Marcus Ericsson taking his first Indianapolis 500 victory.

Ericsson's victory was the second for a driver from Sweden, after Kenny Bräck's win in 1999. It was the fifth Indianapolis 500 victory for the Chip Ganassi Racing team, but its first since 2012. For winning, Ericsson earned $3.1 million from a record purse of $16,000,200. Despite his late race accident, Jimmie Johnson was elected Rookie of the Year. The decision to award Johnson Rookie of the Year honors was divisive, with several motor racing journalists as well as some competitors suggesting that David Malukas – the highest finishing rookie in 16th – was more deserving of the award.

During the course of the race, Scott Dixon set a new record for Most career laps led in the Indianapolis 500. By leading 95 laps during the race, Dixon reached 665 total career laps led, surpassing the previous mark set by Al Unser of 644 laps led.

Box score

 Points include qualification points from time trials, 1 point for leading a lap, and 2 points for most laps led.

 All 33 qualifiers utilized a Dallara chassis with the Universal Aero Kit 18 and Firestone tires.

Broadcasting

Television
The race was televised on NBC and Peacock Premium in the United States. The terrestrial television broadcast was subject to blackout in Central Indiana. The streaming broadcast on Peacock was not subject to blackout, as the platform does not currently have the ability to enforce such restrictions at a local level. NBC received special consent from IMS to stream the race within the blackout region for 2022 only, under the presumption that the required capabilities would be implemented prior to the 2023 race. This was only the sixth time in race history that the race was available to be seen live in the Central Indiana market.

Former driver James Hinchcliffe joined the NBC broadcast team for 2022 as a color commentator, replacing Paul Tracy, who had been in the role for the previous three years for the race.

On May 4, NBC announced their full crew for the race broadcast. Mike Tirico and Danica Patrick returned as the hosts for pre-race and post-race coverage, while Dale Earnhardt Jr. and Rutledge Wood returned for pre-race coverage. Tirico, Patrick, and Earnhardt were also announced as part of the "Peacock Pit Box" crew for mid-race coverage. Dillon Welch joined the crew as a pit reporter, replacing Kelli Stavast, who had been part of NBC's coverage since 2019.

Radio
The race was carried by the IndyCar Radio Network. The chief announcer or "Voice of the 500" for the seventh consecutive year was Mark Jaynes with Davey Hamilton as driver analyst.

References

External links

Indianapolis Motor Speedway – Official site
NTT IndyCar Series – Official site

Indianapolis 500 races
Indianapolis 500
Indianapolis 500
Indianapolis 500
Indianapolis 500
21st century in Indianapolis